Ernst Ludwig von Leutsch (August 16, 1808 – July 28, 1887) was a German classical philologist born in Frankfurt am Main.

He studied classical philology at the University of Göttingen, where he had as instructors Georg Ludolf Dissen, Christoph Wilhelm Mitscherlich and Karl Otfried Müller. It was during this time period that he became lifelong friends with Friedrich Wilhelm Schneidewin.

In 1830 he received his doctorate, and moved to Berlin for a year, where he continued his education under August Boeckh. In 1831 he returned to Göttingen, where in 1837 he was appointed an associate professor. From 1842 to 1883 he was a full professor of classical philology at the University of Göttingen. Following his retirement, he was replaced at Göttingen by Ulrich von Wilamowitz-Moellendorff.

Following the death of Schneidewin in 1856, Leutsch took over editorship of the Philologus, a journal on classical studies. He remained editor of the journal until his death in 1887. In 1868 he founded the philological gazette, Philologischen Anzeiger. Not a prolific author of books, Leutsch's focus was primarily on his academic teaching, with his favorite subjects being Pindar, Aristophanes, Thucydides, Livy and Tacitus.

Leutsch died in Göttingen.

References

Sources 
 The Classical review (Volume 3) by Classical Association (Great Britain) (Google Books) by D. Nutt, 1889.

1808 births
1887 deaths
Writers from Frankfurt
German classical philologists
Academic staff of the University of Göttingen